There have been four baronetcies created for persons with the surname FitzGerald, one in the Baronetage of Ireland and three in the Baronetage of the United Kingdom.

The FitzGerald Baronetcy, of Clenlish in the County of Limerick, was created in the Baronetage of Ireland on 8 February 1644 for Edmond FitzGerald. The second Baronet was attainted in 1691 and the baronetcy forfeited.

The FitzGerald Baronetcy, of Newmarket on Fergus, or Carrigoran in the County of Clare, was created in the Baronetage of the United Kingdom on 5 January 1822 for Augustine FitzGerald. The title became extinct on the death of the fifth Baronet in 1908.

The FitzGerald Baronetcy, of Valentia in the County of Kerry, was created in the Baronetage of the United Kingdom on 8 July 1880 for Sir Peter George Fitzgerald, 19th Knight of Kerry.

The FitzGerald Baronetcy, of Geraldine Place in St Finn Barr in the County of Cork, was created in the Baronetage of the United Kingdom on 10 October 1903 for Edward FitzGerald, Lord Mayor of Cork in 1901, 1902 and 1903. The presumed third Baronet did not use the title and never successfully proved his succession, and was consequently never on the Official Roll of the Baronetage. His younger brother the presumed fourth Baronet (who was a Roman Catholic priest) did not use the title either and did also not successfully prove his succession and was therefore not on the Official Roll of the Baronetage, with the baronetcy considered dormant since 1957.

FitzGerald baronets, of Clenlish (1617)
Sir Edmond Fitzgerald, 1st Baronet (died )
Sir John Fitzgerald, 2nd Baronet (died 1708) (forfeit 1691)

FitzGerald baronets, of Newmarket on Fergus (1822)

Sir Augustine Fitzgerald, 1st Baronet (–1834)
Sir William Fitzgerald, 2nd Baronet (c. 1780–1847)
Sir Edward Fitzgerald, 3rd Baronet (1806–1865)
Sir Augustine Fitzgerald, 4th Baronet (1809–1893)
Sir George Cumming Fitzgerald, 5th Baronet (1823–1908)

This baronetcy was held by the Fitzgerald of Carrigoran family in County Clare. The first baronet, Sir Augustine, was son of Edward Fitzgerald (c. 1736–1814) of Carrigoran, M.P. for Co. Clare, 1782. The family were a branch of the Geraldines of Pallas, County Limerick, becoming established at Carrigoran, parish of Kilnasoolagh, barony of Bunratty Lower, County Clare, which they bought in 1678 from Col. Daniel O'Brien, later Viscount Clare.

FitzGerald baronets, of Valentia (1880)

Sir Peter George Fitzgerald, 1st Baronet of Valentia, 19th Knight of Kerry (1808–1880)
Sir Maurice Fitzgerald, 2nd Baronet of Valentia, 20th Knight of Kerry (1844–1916)
Sir John Peter Gerald Maurice Fitzgerald, 3rd Baronet of Valentia, 21st Knight of Kerry (1884–1957)
Sir Arthur Henry Brinsley Fitzgerald, 4th Baronet of Valentia, 22nd Knight of Kerry (1885–1967)
Sir George Peter Maurice Fitzgerald, 5th Baronet of Valentia, 23rd Knight of Kerry (1917–2001)
Sir Adrian James Andrew Denis Fitzgerald, 6th Baronet, 24th Knight of Kerry (born 1940)

FitzGerald baronets, of Geraldine Place (1903)

Sir Edward Fitzgerald, 1st Baronet (1846–1927)
Sir John Joseph Fitzgerald, 2nd Baronet (1876–1957)
Edward Thomas Fitzgerald, presumed 3rd Baronet (1912–1988)
Daniel Patrick Fitzgerald, presumed 4th Baronet (1916–2016)
Sir Andrew Peter FitzGerald, presumed 5th Baronet (born 1950)

See also
 FitzGerald dynasty

Notes

References
Kidd, Charles, Williamson, David (editors). Debrett's Peerage and Baronetage (1990 edition). New York: St Martin's Press, 1990, 

Baronetcies in the Baronetage of the United Kingdom
Extinct baronetcies in the Baronetage of the United Kingdom
Forfeited baronetcies in the Baronetage of Ireland
FitzGerald dynasty